Luther Clarke House is a historic home located at Dryden in Tompkins County, New York. It is a 2-story, five-by-two-bay, frame Federal-style structure built about 1820.

It was listed on the National Register of Historic Places in 1984.

References

Houses on the National Register of Historic Places in New York (state)
Federal architecture in New York (state)
Houses completed in 1820
Houses in Tompkins County, New York
National Register of Historic Places in Tompkins County, New York